Marcin Marciniszyn (born 7 September 1982, in Bystrzyca Kłodzka) is a Polish sprinter who specializes in the 400 metres.

Competition record

Personal bests
Outdoor
 100 metres – 10.76 s (2012)
 200 metres – 21.07 s (2011)
 400 metres – 45.27 s (2011)

Indoor
 400 metres – 46.64 (2006)

References
 

1982 births
Living people
Polish male sprinters
Athletes (track and field) at the 2004 Summer Olympics
Athletes (track and field) at the 2012 Summer Olympics
Olympic athletes of Poland
World Athletics Championships medalists
People from Bystrzyca Kłodzka
Sportspeople from Lower Silesian Voivodeship
Śląsk Wrocław athletes
World Athletics Indoor Championships medalists
21st-century Polish people